Ko Min-hyuk (born 10 February 1996) is a South Korean footballer who last played as a midfielder for Abahani.

Club career 
Ko joined Ulsan Hyundai in 2015 and in July 2015, he was loaned to Daejeon Citizen.

On 5 July 2015 Ko made his league debut against Jeonbuk Hyundai.

International career 
He was a member of the South Korea national U-17 team for the 2012 AFC U-16 Championship.

Club career statistics

External links 
 
 

1996 births
Living people
South Korean footballers
Association football midfielders
Ulsan Hyundai FC players
Daejeon Hana Citizen FC players
Seoul E-Land FC players
K League 1 players
K League 2 players
South Korean expatriate footballers
Bangladesh Football Premier League players
South Korean expatriate sportspeople in Bangladesh
Abahani Limited (Dhaka) players